Heidi Mark (born February 18, 1971) is an American model and actress. She is of Finnish descent; her father was born in Helsinki, Finland. She has worked at her father's law office and Hooters. She was Playboys Playmate of the Month for July 1995. Prior to being a Playmate, she appeared on the cover of the April 1994 issue of the magazine.

Mark was married to Vince Neil of Mötley Crüe on May 28, 2000. She filed for divorce in August 2001, citing "irreconcilable differences".

Partial filmography

 Ocean Ave. as Jazz De Guise (4 episodes, 2002–2003)
 Man of the Year (2002) as Carol
 Life Without Dick (2002) as Crossing Guard Stripper
 Rock Star (2001) as Kirk's Wife
 The Judge (2001) (TV) as Brittany Hill
 Providence (1 episode, 2001)
 Diagnosis: Murder as Ashley Wellers (1 episode, 2000)
 Beverly Hills, 90210 as Amy (1 episode, 2000)
 Dharma & Greg as Allison (1 episode, 2000)
 3rd Rock from the Sun as Miranda (1 episode, 2000)
 Charmed as Darla (1 episode, 1999)
 Ally McBeal as Alice Gaylor (1 episode, 1999)
 Hope Island as Stella Cooper (1 episode, 1999)
 Love Boat: The Next Wave as Cruise Director Nicole Jordan (season 2, 1998–1999)
 Steel Chariots (1997) (TV) as Amber
 Head Over Heels as Nikki (1 episode, 1997)
 Weapons of Mass Distraction (1997) (TV) as Cricket Paige
 Baywatch as a Blonde Con-Artist and Holly (3 episodes, 1995–1996)
 Married... with Children as Ashley (3 episodes, 1995–1996)
 High Tide as Dee Dee (2 episodes, 1995)
 Baywatch the Movie: Forbidden Paradise (1995) as Holly
 The Young and the Restless as Sharon Newman (unknown episodes, 1994)
 Silk Stalkings as Christine (1 episode, 1994)
 Thunder in Paradise (1994) TV series as Allison Wilson (unknown episodes)
 Red Shoe Diaries as Rebecca (1 episode, 1994)

References

External links
 
 

1971 births
American film actresses
American television actresses
American people of Finnish descent
Living people
Actresses from Columbus, Ohio
1990s Playboy Playmates
21st-century American women